Ainārs Podziņš (born 16 March 1992, in Jūrmala, Latvia) is a Latvian and Russian ice hockey forward, currently playing for HC Kramatorsk of the UHL.

For a longer period of time Podziņš, a native of Latvia, carried a Russian passport and even played for the Russian U17 national team. However, in the summer of 2010, after joining Dinamo Riga, Podziņš managed to regain his Latvian citizenship.

In December 2017, Podziņš signed for the Edinburgh Capitals of the UK EIHL. He has since had spells in Australia, France, Kazakhstan and Ukraine.

Career statistics

Regular season and playoffs

References

External links
 
 
 Global-sport profile
 Ainārs's blog on allhockey.ru

1992 births
Living people
HC Almaty players
EHC Bayreuth players
Dinamo Riga players
HC Donbass players
Edinburgh Capitals players
Iisalmen Peli-Karhut players
Krylya Sovetov Moscow players
HC Kuban players
Latvian ice hockey forwards
HK Liepājas Metalurgs players
MHC Martin players
CBR Brave players
LHC Les Lions players
Metallurg Novokuznetsk players
People from Jūrmala
HK Riga players
Sokol Krasnoyarsk players
HC Vityaz players
Latvian expatriate sportspeople in Scotland
Latvian expatriate ice hockey people
Expatriate ice hockey players in Scotland
Latvian expatriate sportspeople in France
Latvian expatriate sportspeople in Kazakhstan
Expatriate ice hockey players in Kazakhstan
Expatriate ice hockey players in France
Expatriate ice hockey players in Ukraine
Latvian expatriate sportspeople in Ukraine
Latvian expatriate sportspeople in Germany
Expatriate ice hockey players in Germany
Russian expatriate sportspeople in Ukraine
Russian expatriate sportspeople in Scotland
Russian expatriate sportspeople in Germany
Russian expatriate sportspeople in France
Latvian expatriate sportspeople in Australia
Latvian expatriate sportspeople in Austria
Latvian expatriate sportspeople in Slovakia
Russian expatriate sportspeople in Slovakia
Russian expatriate sportspeople in Austria
Russian expatriate sportspeople in Australia
Expatriate ice hockey players in Australia
Expatriate ice hockey players in Austria
Expatriate ice hockey players in Slovakia
Russian expatriate ice hockey people